Vĩnh Thạnh is a rural district (huyện) of Bình Định province in the South Central Coast region of Vietnam. The district capital is Vĩnh Thạnh town.

Administrative areas

Vinh Thanh district has 9 administrative units, the town of Vinh Thanh (the district capital) and 8 communes: Vinh Hao, Vinh Hiep, Vinh Hoa, Vinh Kim, Vinh Quang, Vinh Son, Vinh Thinh,  Vinh Thuan.

References

Districts of Bình Định province